Mathias Walsh (born 14 March 1964) is a Dominican cricketer. He played in one List A and four first-class matches for the Windward Islands in 1991/92.

See also
 List of Windward Islands first-class cricketers

References

External links
 

1964 births
Living people
Dominica cricketers
Windward Islands cricketers